Brotherhood is an American crime drama television series created by Blake Masters about the intertwining lives of the Irish-American Caffee brothers from Providence, Rhode Island: Tommy (Jason Clarke) is a local politician and Michael (Jason Isaacs) is a gangster involved with New England's Irish Mob. The show also features their mother Rose (Fionnula Flanagan), cousin Colin Carr (Brían F. O'Byrne), childhood friend and Rhode Island state detective Declan Giggs (Ethan Embry), Irish mob boss Freddie Cork (Kevin Chapman), Tommy's wife Eileen (Annabeth Gish), and Michael's criminal partner Pete McGonagle (Stivi Paskoski).

Brotherhood was originally broadcast by the premium cable network Showtime in the United States from July 9, 2006, to December 21, 2008, with the show's three seasons consisting of eleven, ten and eight episodes. The show was not renewed after its third season, which Showtime later confirmed was the last.
The series was produced and almost entirely written by Masters and Henry Bromell. It was filmed on location in Providence, Rhode Island.

Brotherhood received widespread critical acclaim—with critics particularly praising Masters and Bromell's nuanced writing and the central performances of Clarke and Isaacs—but did not attract a large audience. The show won a Peabody Award.

Production

Conception
Brotherhood was created by New England native Blake Masters. Prior to creating the series, Masters made a living selling screenplays to film studios; however, he never got an original project produced. Masters' pitched Brotherhood to Executive Producer Elizabeth Guber Stephen as a feature film; the premise was inspired by the real-life Bulger brothers from Massachusetts: William M. Bulger was a prominent state politician and his brother, James J. Bulger, was the leader of the Irish-American crime family Winter Hill Gang. 
Stephen told Masters and his agent Brant Rose that it would work better as a series. Masters agreed to adapt it into a television series, reasoning that "the dynamic between the brothers was sustainable and compelling." Stephen brought Masters to present the idea to premium cable network Showtime, who were immediately receptive and financed the production of a pilot episode. After the pilot had been shot, it was shown to the Showtime executives, who ordered an entire season.
Because of Masters' inexperience in producing television, Showtime executives asked him to find someone to help him spearhead the project. Masters, a fan of Homicide: Life on the Street, suggested Henry Bromell, who had previously worked on Homicide as a writer/executive producer. A meeting was arranged between Masters and Bromell through Showtime. Bromell was impressed with the pilot and accepted Masters' offer to join the production crew.

Crew

Executive producers Masters and Bromell served as showrunners and head writers during the production of the show's three seasons. Masters wrote five episodes of the first and second seasons, which consisted of eleven and ten episodes, respectively, and three of the third eight-episode season; Bromell wrote three episodes of the first season, five of the second and three of the third. The show has had three writers other than Masters and Bromell: the writing team of Dawn Prestwich and Nicole Yorkin, who wrote three episodes of the first season and served as co-executive producers, and executive producer Karen Hall, who wrote two episodes of the third season.

The pilot episode, "Mark 8:36", was directed by Australian director Phillip Noyce. Noyce's background in film drew some praise for his strong visual sense direction of the pilot but was also criticized for distracting from the writing and not fitting with the direction of later episodes.
Noyce also directed the second season premiere. Veteran television director Ed Bianchi directed seven episodes of the show, including the first and second season finales, making him the show's most frequent director. Other recurring directors include Nick Gomez, who directed three episodes, and Steve Shill, Alik Sakharov and Brian Kirk who directed two episodes each. Jean de Segonzac, Leslie Libman, Thomas Carter, Michael Corrente, Seith Mann and Tim Hunter directed one episode each. Masters and Bromell have also directed the series, with Bromell having directed three episode and Masters two.

Sets and locations
The series was filmed largely on location in Providence, Rhode Island. After Elizabeth Guber Stephen was told they couldn't shoot in Boston due to budget, Stephen worked out a deal with the Rhode Island Film Office to work within the network budget.  Stephen and her team also helped write the tax incentive legislation for film and television production in Rhode Island.

The Providence Journal editorialized on the production as follows:

Some scenes were filmed at the Olneyville New York System Restaurant in Providence.
In May 2007 the show's camera crews went to Woonsocket, Rhode Island, to film various street scenes and buildings in that city for inclusion in future episodes of the show.

Cast and characters

Recurring characters 
 Billy Smith as Jeff "Moe" Riley (Seasons 1–3) – One of Freddie's henchmen, he consistently shows a pathological lack of common sense and regard for other people, which makes him very unpopular with almost everyone, especially Michael. Thanks to events in the first season, Moe holds a grudge against Michael that persists through the whole series.
 Kerry O'Malley as Mary Kate Martinson, Michael and Tommy's sister
 Bates Wilder as Jimmy Martinson, Mary Kate's husband
 Madison Garland as Lila Caffee, Tommy and Eileen's daughter
 Kailey Gilbert as Noni Caffee, Tommy and Eileen's daughter
 Tina Benko as Kath Perry
 Karl Bury as Alex Byrne, Tommy's assistant (Seasons 1 & 2)
 Len Cariou as Judd Fitzgerald (Seasons 1 & 2)
 Kevin Conway as Neil Caffee
 John Fiore as Alphonse Nozzoli (Seasons 1-3)
 Michael Gaston as Mr. Speaker (Season 1)
 Damien Di Paola as Paul Carvalho
 Georgia Lyman as Cassie Giggs, Declan's wife
 Frank L. Ridley as Terry Mulligan
 Al Sapienza as Mayor Frank Panzarella
 Brian Scannell as Silent John
 Matt Servitto as Representative Donald Donatello, Speaker of the House
 Scottie Thompson as Shannon McCarthy (Season 1)

Plot synopsis and episode list

Season 1: 2006
The death of a local Irish mob figure, Patrick "Paddy" Mullin, allows for the return of Michael Caffee to "The Hill" neighborhood in Providence. Caffee had been in hiding for seven years after the man vowed to kill him. Upon returning he begins to re-assume his old criminal business alongside his friend Pete McConagle. Michael's boss Freddie Cork tries to blackmail Michael's politician brother Tommy Caffee into assigning him lucrative contracts with a threat to kill Michael. Tommy refuses to be swayed and tells Freddie that he does not care about Michael. Michael manages to arrange a temporary truce with Freddie. Eileen Caffee is cheating on her husband Tommy with Carl Hobbs and is also concealing drug use from her family.

Michael takes over a local store with threats. Tommy defuses the owners intentions to press charges by passing her on to Declan Giggs, an officer who was once friends with the Caffees. Giggs tells her it is too dangerous to testify against the Irish gangs. Michael also takes over a local bar named Mulligans. He rekindles his relationship with Kath Parry and realises how much she cares for him when she stands by him through a shoot out with Russian mobsters.

Tommy turns to Judd for help in preventing a highway being built through "The Hill" and is forced to give up more of his independence. Carl ends his relationship with Eileen. Treasury agents raid Rose Caffee's residence looking for counterfeit money belonging to Michael. They are unsuccessful but the scandal costs Tommy further political capital and he pledges his loyalty to the speaker of the house. Tommy uses his political influence to turn a profit but is outraged when he finds the speaker of the house stealing. Tommy maneuvers his way to the house majority leader position.

Michael helps Declan dispose of a body after Declan's partner unwittingly shoots an undercover FBI agent. Eileen's drug use intensifies and she is arrested for erratic behavior; Pete also gives in to his addiction and Michael takes him to Alcoholics Anonymous. Tommy's eldest daughter Mary Rose is caught trying some of her mother's drugs by Michael and he gives her a job in his store to keep an eye on her. Pete and Eileen realize their common ground.

A bus crash on the way back from a football game leaves several residents of "The Hill" dead. The accident was caused by the suicide of Freddie Cork's son, who was openly homosexual. Michael uses this information to manipulate Freddie. Freddie pressures Tommy into ensuring that his son receives a Roman Catholic requiem mass. Carl is also killed and Eileen resolves to atone for her sins. Marty Trio's wife is also killed and he finally decides to work with the police.

Neil Caffee arrives in town and Michael and Tommy form an uneasy alliance to get rid of their father. Rose confronts Michael about how he makes his living. Tommy discovers that his daughter has been working for Michael, ending their period of cooperation.  Everyone in "The Hill" attends a big Irish wedding, as Tommy Caffee tries to avoid a legal trap set up by an ambitious U.S. Attorney, who has promised him immunity if he will testify about Michael's dealing with Freddie. He must also protect his brother from being whacked by Moe Riley, who has been released from prison and is out for revenge. Declan finds his partner may be a dirty cop and must decide where his loyalty lies. He blames Michael for making him "go bad" and pistol whips him.

The titles of all episodes in this season are from religious texts.

Season 2: 2007
Showtime renewed the show for a second season, consisting of 10 episodes (bringing the total number of episodes to 21.) Unlike episode titles from season one which were based Bible passages, season two episode titles were based on lyrics from songs written and performed by Bob Dylan. The first episode officially aired on September 30, 2007, with the season finale airing on December 2. However, on July 18, 2007, the first two episodes of season 2 were leaked to the internet via torrent.

The season begins a few months after the conclusion of season one. Michael has survived Declan's attack, though his awareness is compromised and he has no memory of the attack. Michael finds himself shut out of the mob's activity, with Freddie having sold the liquor store while Michael was sick. Desperate to prove his competence, Michael kills a jewish gangster who owes Freddie money, but not before having the first in a series of paralyzing seizures. Tommy has grown closer to Judd as he continues to counter Franklin's efforts against both Michael and himself. Judd asks Tommy to rein in Rep. Paul Carvalho, the Portuguese representative who is publicly backing a rival (Portuguese) candidate for U.S. senate in the upcoming election. Ellis Franklin has Tommy sit for a deposition about Michael and Freddie, but when he fails to tell Franklin what he wants to hear, Franklin sets up one of his detectives as a businessman looking to bribe Tommy for a state contract. When Tommy sees through the trap, he sets up Carvalho with the same detective, stalling Franklin's investigation and neutering Carvahlo's support for the rival candidate. Declan spirals out of control after Cassie leaves him and Moe blackmails him, as Moe is the only one who knows Declan tried to kill Michael at the Finnerty wedding. However, Declan assures Moe that if anyone finds out about the wedding, everyone will find out about Moe's deal with the Secret Service.

Season 3: 2008
The third season began airing on November 2, 2008 and consisted of 8 episodes. It ended on December 21, 2008. The titles of all episodes of season three are quotations from Shakespeare.

Season 3 begins in the late summer, some time after  the events of Season 2. The fact that Tommy had known that Freddie planned to kill Michael at the Finnerty wedding and yet said nothing, ruptured the brothers’ relationship, with no immediate prospect of reconciliation. Michael has developed severe paranoia and is now on medication for his psychosis. He is still an informant for Franklin, although this arrangement is imperilled when Paul Carvalho, (the Portuguese politician whom Tommy had set up for bribery charges in Season 2) agrees to talk to the authorities and Jack Boyle arranges Freddie’s release from prison. Michael knows that Freddie will contract Nozzolli to kill him, so he attempts to remove Nozolli by implicating him in a deal to sell HGH supplied by a local dentist, and then exposing the scheme to Franklin. The DEA have been watching the dentist for months and swoop first. Franklin does not care that Michael’s plan has failed, and mocks him.  Michael beats him to death. Tommy is still majority leader, although his unsuccessful attempt at capturing the speakership has forced him to become Speaker Donatello's errand boy. This brings him into contact with Brian Kilpatrick, a developer who wants the state to buy decrepit industrial property on the city's waterfront. Eileen, now pregnant, is consequently finding her new duties at Social Services difficult. Tommy wants to quit politics and promises Eileen that they will leave The Hill within two years. The episode concludes with a meeting between Tommy, Kilpatrick and the president of Bodie Company, with Tommy telling the president that he will get a lucrative stake in the waterfront if he buys all of the holdings of Tommy's Landowne development company.

End
On April 7, 2009, rumors began circulating that the show had been canceled. In January, Robert Greenblatt, Showtime's entertainment president, was reportedly non-committal when asked if Brotherhood would be back.

In an interview with E! online in mid-March 2009, actress Fionnula Flanagan said that the actors had yet to hear from the producers about the fourth season. Also, the Hollywood Reporter has reported that Jason Clarke had been cast in an unnamed pilot for CBS. Kevin Chapman, who plays Freddie, is now cast as Terrence Garrity, brother of the Sean character in the FX series Rescue Me. Television critics also pointed to the end of season three as potentially the end of the series, saying that the finale seemed to convey a sense of closure, wrapping up storylines.

On June 29, 2009, Showtime confirmed that the series would not be renewed, and that the third season DVD would be billed as "The Final Season."

American satellite television provider DirecTV rebroadcast the series beginning in February 2010.

Themes
The series focuses on the concept of brotherhood through the antagonistic relationship between the Caffee brothers. Through its examination of family, the show makes loyalty a recurring theme. Though the two brothers follow different paths and try to assert their differences from one another, they often prove similar. The show portrays Michael and Tommy striving for the good of their neighborhood through politics and crime, which are often portrayed as similar. Corruption and the way it infiltrates families, neighborhoods and governments is another theme. The examination of big city corruption has been compared to the work of Sidney Lumet.

Masters has admitted an intention to make the city of Providence a character in the show. The Hollywood Reporter noted the parallels between the morally grey areas inhabited by the characters and the muted tones of their surroundings. "The Hill" is dominated by Irish Americans and the show has been characterised as examining ethnicity.

Michael's morality
In an interview relating to the series, Jason Isaacs described Michael as follows: "Well actually, Michael Caffee is not a bad guy. I wouldn't have done this if he was a bad guy. He's a really interesting man. He has a really strict ethical code that he adheres to and he thinks he is better for the neighborhood and the future of the city than his brother is. He thinks his brother is corrupt. He's part of the system."

Reception

Viewing figures
Despite having a subpar total viewership of 540,000, Showtime renewed the series for a second season which aired in Fall 2007. It was renewed for a third season with eight episodes as of January 21, 2008.

Critical acclaim

Many critics compared the series to The Sopranos. Some felt that it was actually closer in tone to another HBO drama, The Wire, in portraying "a fine-textured portrait of a blue-collar city" and predicted comparable under performance in finding an audience. LA Weekly stated that the show may be more satisfying in its emotional payoffs for viewers than the sixth season of The Sopranos. Critics have characterized the show as being part of a wave of programming that puts Showtime on a level pegging with their pay cable rival HBO for quality.

Critics have praised the central performances of Clarke and Isaacs. They have also commented on the authenticity in casting down to the minor roles and the strong characterization of the supporting cast. The Hollywood Reporter named the show as the one to watch over the summer it debuted and stated that the ensemble of well drawn characters created a "reality that speaks to the collision of interests, the dispersal of power and the impossibility of effective compromise." The Phoenix picked out Annabeth Gish's against type role as an adulterous addict as potentially re-defining her career. Variety said that Isaacs performance as Michael provided the lifeblood of the series by grabbing the attention.

The Seattle Post Intelligencer described the show as a "masterpiece." Variety called it "the jewel Showtime has sought for years."

Criticism
The show has been criticized as lacking the humorous approach of Italian-American gangster stories like A Bronx Tale, Goodfellas, and The Sopranos. The show has also been described as initially off-putting due to its flawed characters but became more involving as it progresses.

Accolades
The show was a 2006 Peabody Award winner.

DVD release

International broadcasters

References

External links
 official
 Brotherhood on TV Squad
 
 
 An Interview with Series Creator Blake Masters
 NewYorkTimes: Mobster and Politician, Neither Rolling in Clover
 It Felt Like the End of 'Brotherhood' - Roger Catlin | TV Eye

2006 American television series debuts
2008 American television series endings
2000s American crime drama television series
Irish-American culture in Rhode Island
Television shows set in Rhode Island
Showtime (TV network) original programming
Peabody Award-winning television programs
Television series by CBS Studios
English-language television shows
Television series about dysfunctional families
Television shows filmed in Rhode Island
Works about Irish-American organized crime